Highway 14 (AR 14, Ark. 14, and Hwy. 14) is an east–west state highway in Arkansas. The route of  begins at Boat Dock Road near Table Rock Lake and runs east to Mississippi County Route W1020 (CR W1020) at Golden Lake. Segments of the highway are part of two Arkansas Scenic Byways: Sylamore Scenic Byway in the Ozark National Forest and the Crowley's Ridge Parkway atop Crowley's Ridge.

The highway's general alignment between the western terminus and Marked Tree closely follows the original routing as established in the initial 1926 Arkansas state highway numbering plan. The route from Highway 140 in Lepanto east across Interstate 55 to Golden Lake is a later extension.

Route description
Highway 14 begins in the Ozark Mountains near Table Rock Lake less than one mile (1.6 km) from the Missouri state line. State maintenance begins on a roadway maintained by the Boone County Road Department named Boat Dock Road; which continues westerly to Cricket Creek Park, a campground on the lake. US 65 and Highway 14 form a concurrency southbound along the four-lane divided highway. After , Highway 14 turns from US 65 toward the small community of Omaha, ending the concurrency. As the road approaches Main Street in Omaha, Highway 14 turns east and exits the city. Highway 14 winds east through a rural part of Boone County, passing through the unincorporated community of New Hope and crossing Charley Creek and Bear Creek. Highway 14 intersects Highway 281; the two form a brief concurrency northward before Highway 281 turns to the north, with Highway 14 continuing east. Highway 14 begins to roughly parallel Bull Shoals Lake toward Lead Hill; upon entering the city, Highway 14 forms a concurrency with Highway 7 through Lead Hill which ends just south of the city limits. Highway 14 continues east into Marion County; crossing East Sugarloaf Creek and serving as the western terminus of Highway 268 just east of the county line.

The highway curves southward away from Bull Shoals Lake and into the rural Ozarks; it winds through Monarch to a junction with Highway 125. Highway 14 continues south past the Slippery Hollow Natural Area, a preserved area of caves serving as habitat the Ozark big-eared bat and other endangered species and the unincorporated community of Lakeway before a junction with another segment of Highway 125. Highway 14 curves eastward, entering the small town of Summit from the north and becomes Main Street. In Summit, Highway 14 crosses over the Missouri and Northern Arkansas Railroad tracks, becomes a section line road, and meets Highway 202 (Park Avenue) at a four-way stop intersection. Continuing south, Highway 14 passes within two blocks of the Marion County Fairgrounds before entering Yellville, the county seat of Marion County. Now designated Panther Avenue, the road passes Yellville–Summit High School and Central Ozarks Medical Center before curving through a residential section of town and intersecting US 62 and US 412 in downtown Yellville.

The three routes form a concurrency eastbound along Main Street, passing through the historic commercial center of Yellville, including the Marion County Courthouse. US 62/US 412/AR 14 bridge the East Prong Town Branch before Highway 14 turns south, ending the concurrency. Highway 14 bridges Crooked Creek and passes Yellville City Park before serving as the northern terminus of Highway 235 and departing Yellville to the south. The highway runs south through a rural area, serving as the western terminus of Highway 206 near Ralph and Highway 268 near Mull before entering the Buffalo National River protected area, bridging the namesake river, and crossing into Searcy County.

Highway 14 passes through the northeast corner of Searcy County; a sparsely populated part of the Ozark Mountains. The highway exits the Buffalo National River area and passes near Loafer's Glory Wildlife Management Area near Evening Star. Continuing south, Highway 14 serves as the northern terminus of Highway 27 at a t-intersection at Harriet, with Highway 14 turning left to continue eastbound into Baxter County. The highway enters the small town of Big Flat, serving as the northern terminus of Highway 263 and passing two school buildings (Tri-County High School and the Big Flat School Gymnasium) before exiting the city to the east. Highway 14 enters the Ozark National Forest and serves as the southern terminus of Highway 341 before exiting the county eastbound into Stone County.

Continuing through the Ozark National Forest, Highway 14 enters Stone County and passes through the small town of Fifty-Six before an intersection with Forest Service Road 1110. At this intersection, the route becomes part of the Sylamore Scenic Byway, a National Forest Scenic Byway and Arkansas Scenic Byway. The designation follows Highway 14 through a popular tourist area, serving the Mirror Lake Historic District, Blanchard Springs Caverns, and the Gunner Pool Recreation Area. The highway serves as the northern terminus of Highway 87 and winds eastward to a junction with Highway 5 and Highway 9; two north–south highways running concurrently, at Allison near the White River. Highway 14 joins the concurrency southbound into Mountain View, with the Sylamore Scenic Byway turning north toward Calico Rock.

In Mountain View, the county seat of Stone County, the three-route concurrency ends at a T-intersection with Main Street; Highway 9 turns west, with Highway 5 and Highway 14 turning east together. The two routes serve a commercial area of the city, including the Mountain View Airport, Sylamore Ranger District Office of the Ozark National Forest, Mountain View High School, and the Stone County Medical Center before Highway 5 turns south, ending the concurrency. Highway 14 continues eastbound through rural Stone County, passing through sparsely populated and forested Ozarks hills, serving as the western terminus for Highway 58 before beginning a stretch passing several historic properties listed on the National Register of Historic Places: the John Bettis House in Pleasant Grove, and six properties in Marcella, including: the H.J. Doughtery House, Marcella Church & School, Thomas E. Hess House, and the Binks Hess House and Barn, as well as the Taylor-Stokes House and Walter Gray House near Melrose.

The highway enters Independence County, running between the White River and the Foushee Cave Natural Area and crossing Rocky Creek before an intersection with Highway 25 at the unincorporated community of Locust Grove. The two routes form a concurrency heading east to the small town of Southside just south of Batesville, where Highway 14 breaks from the concurrency at a junction with US 167. Highway 14 continues south as Allen Chapel Road through Southside before exiting the city. Near Salado, Highway 14 serves as the eastern terminus of its only spur route, which runs west into Southside. The route continues eastward, roughly paralleling the White River toward Oil Trough. The highway crosses Salado Creek and Goodie Creek, both tributaries of the White River, before serving as the northern terminus of Highway 157 west of Oil Trough. Within the city, Highway 14 serves as Main Street and passes the historic Hankins' Store before exiting eastbound. Highway 14 continues east to serve as the western terminus of Highway 122 before entering Jackson County.

Highway 14 passes through the unincorporated community of Macks before an intersection with Highway 367; these two routes form a concurrency eastbound toward Newport. Together they span the White River and the Union Pacific Railroad tracks before turning sharply onto Third Street and running downtown. The highways pass the Jackson County Courthouse and the Arkansas Rock N Roll Highway 67 Museum in downtown. Continuing east, the highways serve as the southern terminus of Highway 69 before becoming Malcom Street. Highway 14 turns south at State Street, marking the end of the concurrency. Highway 14 continues south past the Newport Country Club before serving as the northern terminus of a segment of Highway 17 and exiting the city southbound. The highway curves east and interchanges with US 67 (Future Interstate 57, I-57) and Highway 224, the frontage road on the east side of the freeway. Continuing eastbound, Highway 14 passes the Erwin Auxiliary Army Airfield and has another junction with Highway 17 at Erwin. Due to the roadway alignment, a short suffixed route, Highway 14Y serves as a short connector for westbound travelers turning from Highway 14 to Highway 17. The highway continues east as a section line road, serving as a northern terminus for Highway 145, bridging the Cache River, and briefly overlapping with Highway 37 at Amagon before entering Poinsett County and the Arkansas Delta.

Highway 14 runs east as a section line road, passing through the Earl Buss/Bayou Deview Wildlife Management Area and crossing Bayou DeView before an intersection with the Union Pacific Railway tracks and US 49/US 63 in Waldenburg. The highway continues east through sparsely populated agricultural lands, crossing the L'Anguille River before entering the county seat of Harrisburg. Highway 14 intersects Highway 1 and crosses the Union Pacific railroad tracks in the city before passing through the Harrisburg Commercial Historic District, which includes the Poinsett County Courthouse. Just east of the city limits, Highway 14 has a brief overlap with Highway 163, which carries the Crowley's Ridge Parkway designation. The highway continues east, briefly overlapping Highway 373 and serving as the southern terminus of Highway 463 at Payneway before an interchange with Interstate 555 (I-555). Highway 14 concurs with I-555 southbound, crossing the St. Francis Bay Floodway before exiting in Marked Tree. Highway 14 begins an overlap with Highway 75 northbound, together crossing the St. Francis River and serving as the northern terminus of Highway 149 (Frisco Street) near the Marked Tree Commercial Historic District. At Broadway, Highway 75 ends, with Highway 14 forming a concurrency with Highway 140. Broadway continues east as Highway 308B. Highway 14 concurs with Highway 140 to the small town of Lepanto, when Highway 140 turns northward, with Highway 14 continuing eastbound into Mississippi County.

Running east as a section line road through sparsely populated agricultural areas, Highway 14 intersects Highway 77 and serves as the northern terminus of Highway 297 before a junction with I-55. Continuing east, Highway  passes Rivercrest High School, serves as the eastern terminus of Highway 181, and enters the small town of Marie. At a junction with Highway 119, Highway 14 turns south toward Wilson. In Wilson, Highway 14 passes the Wilson Commercial Historic District and intersects US 61 (Cortez Kennedy Avenue) before exiting the city southbound. Highway 14 terminates in a rural unincorporated area known as Golden Lake less than a mile from the Tennessee border at Mississippi County Route S449 (CR S449), with the roadway continuing east as CR W1020.

History

State Road 14 was created during the 1926 Arkansas state highway numbering roughly along the current routing between Omaha and Payneway in Poinsett County. The early route included ferry service at both the Buffalo River and the White River (near Oil Trough), and a toll bridge at Newport. In 1940, Highway 14 was rerouted onto Highway 110 between Southside and Oil Trough, with the former alignment becoming part of an extended Highway 69 and Highway 122. Between 1942 and 1945, the designation was extended east to Wilson.

Following construction of the Bull Shoals Dam, three segments of Highway 14 were inundated by Bull Shoals Reservoir. Known as Bear Creek Bay and East and West Sugar Loaf Creek bays, the highway was rerouted around the lake on March 11, 1954. The former alignments remain as county roads near the lake known as "Old Hwy 14".

In 1978, Highway 14 was rerouted south of Batesville. The mainline Highway 14 was rerouted over existing Highway 25 and supplanted Highway 14A. The former Highway 14 mainline route was redesignated as Highway 230 between Locust Grove and Southside. A short original section of Highway 14 between Southside and Salado, discontinuous after the rerouting, was redesignated Highway 14 Spur.

Major intersections
Mile markers reset at some concurrencies.

Related routes

Alternate route

Highway 14A began at Highway 14 at Salado and ran northeast to Ramsey Hill, terminating at US 167 and Highway 25. The route was added to the state highway system on June 23, 1965. Highway 14A was supplanted by mainline Highway 14 during a rerouting in 1978.

Major intersections

Erwin suffixed route

Highway 14Y (AR 14Y, Ark. 14Y, and Hwy. 14Y) is an unsigned connector route of in Jackson County.

Major intersections

See also

Notes

References

External links

 

014
Transportation in Stone County, Arkansas
Transportation in Poinsett County, Arkansas
Transportation in Mississippi County, Arkansas
Transportation in Marion County, Arkansas
Transportation in Jackson County, Arkansas
Transportation in Independence County, Arkansas
Transportation in Boone County, Arkansas
Transportation in Baxter County, Arkansas